The Thérain is a river in France, tributary of the Oise. It rises between Saint-Michel-d'Halescourt and Grumesnil in Seine-Maritime at 175 meters elevation. It flows generally southeast, through Songeons, Milly-sur-Thérain, Beauvais, Hermes and Mouy, and joins the Oise at Creil.

Its valley, near the metropolitan area of Paris, has been a highly industrialized and populated area, and Beauvais lies at the foot of wooded hills on the left bank of the Thérain at its confluence with the Avelon.

Affluents 
 Ruisseau d'Hardouins
 Le Tahier
 Ruisseau de Wambez
 Le Petit Thérain
 L' Avelon
 Rivière de Saint-Quentin
 Rivière de Saint-Just
 La Liovette
 Le Wage
 Ru de Berneuil
 Fosse d'Orgueil
 La Laversines
 La Trye
 Le Sillet
 Ru de la Maladrerie
 Ru de Lombardie
 Le Moineau
 Fossé l' Evêque
 Le Ruisseau de Saint-Claude
 Le Ruisseau de Cires
 Le Ruisseau de Flandre

References

Rivers of France
Rivers of Oise
Rivers of Normandy
Rivers of Hauts-de-France
Rivers of Seine-Maritime